The 2018 Tamil Thalaivas season is the second season of the Tamil Thalaivas' existence in the Pro Kabaddi League. The team is currently led by Ajay Thakur and coached by E Baskaran. Tamil Thalaivas play their home matches at the Jawaharlal Nehru Stadium (Chennai), Tamil Nadu.

Review 
Tamil Thalaivas announced Edachery Bhaskaran as their new head coach. Kasinatha Baskaran, who had been at the helm of affairs in the previous season, will move into the role of Technical Director - Strategic Grassroot Program of the franchise.

Tamil Thalaivas retained the core in form of Ajay Thakur, Amit Hooda and C Arun along with D. Pratap as a new young player, ahead of the auction. 

Sukesh Hegde and Darshan J were also purchased by the franchise at an identical amount of 
Rs 28 Lakh.  All-rounder Manjeet Chillar was also picked up by the Thalaivas for Rs. 20 Lakhs. 
While Rajnish, and Anand join the team as new young players. 

Thalaivas managed to pick up a lot of players on their base price, snapping up a number of bargain buys in the process. South Korean duo Chan Sik Park and Jae Min Lee were two such players.

Current squad

Sponsors

Tamil Thalaivas announced Muthoot Fincorp India will be the Official Title Sponsor for Season 5, 2017. Powered by Maha Cement, Associate sponsors are Agni Steels, Nippon Paints, Smartron and Admiral Sportswear

References 

Pro Kabaddi League teams
Sport in Chennai
Tamil Thalivas